was a Japanese scholar-monk and bureaucrat of the Imperial Court at Nara.  He is best known as a leader of the Hossō sect of Buddhism and as the adversary of Fujiwara no Hirotsugu.

Career
In 717–718, Genbō was part of the Japanese mission to Tang China (Kentōshi) along with Kibi no Makibi, Abe no Nakamaro. Later Bodhisena also joined as their companion. Genbō stayed in China for 17 years.  Genbō brought many esoteric Buddhist texts with him when he returned to Japan. 

At Kōfuku-ji, he was appointed abbot (sōjō) by Emperor Shōmu.

Timeline
 740 (Tenpyō 12): Hirotsugu petitioned for the removal of Genbō; and then Kibi no Makibi and Genbō used this complaint as a pretext to discredit Hirotsugu. As a result, Hirotsugu initiates a futile military campaign in the 9th month of the same year.
 745 (Tenpyō 17): Genbō was exiled to Dazaifu on the island of Kyushu.

At the time of Genbō's death, it was popularly believed that he was killed by the vengeful spirit of Hirotsugu.

See also
 Japanese missions to Imperial China
 Japanese missions to Tang China
 Dōkyō

Notes

References 
 Nussbaum, Louis-Frédéric and Käthe Roth. (2005).  Japan encyclopedia. Cambridge: Harvard University Press. ; 
 Ooms, Herman. (2009). Imperial Politics and Symbolics in Ancient Japan: the Tenmu dynasty, 650-800. Honolulu: University of Hawaii Press. ; 
 Ponsonby-Fane, Richard. (1959). The Imperial House of Japan. Kyoto: Ponsonby Memorial Society. OCLC 194887
 Titsingh, Isaac. (1834).  Annales des empereurs du Japon (Nihon Odai Ichiran).  Paris: Royal Asiatic Society, Oriental Translation Fund of Great Britain and Ireland. 

Year of birth unknown
746 deaths
Japanese Buddhist clergy
People of Nara-period Japan
Japanese ambassadors to the Tang dynasty
Nara period Buddhist clergy